Grant Terry Hall (born 29 October 1991) is an English professional footballer who plays as a central defender for Championship club Rotherham United, on loan from fellow Championship club Middlesbrough. He has previously played for Queens Park Rangers,   Brighton & Hove Albion, Swindon Town, Birmingham City and Tottenham Hotspur.

Club career

Brighton & Hove Albion
On 6 October 2009, Hall transferred to Brighton & Hove Albion after a successful trial period from non-League side Lewes. Hall had previously been involved with Brighton's centre of excellence but missed out on a youth scholarship at 16 and was released.

On 26 December 2011, Hall was named as a substitute for Brighton's 3–0 defeat away to Reading, and was subsequently named once again as a substitute during the 2–0 defeat to Coventry City five days later. Hall made his first senior appearance for Brighton during the 3–0 victory over Southampton at the Falmer Stadium on 2 January 2012, coming on as a 53rd-minute substitute replacing Mauricio Taricco. Hall made his first start for the first team against Wrexham on 7 January 2012 in the FA Cup third round.

Tottenham Hotspur
During May 2012, Hall was offered a new three-year contract amid interest from Premier League side Tottenham Hotspur. He rejected the offer, and signed for Tottenham Hotspur. The defender made his debut during a pre-season friendly against Kingstonian.

Loan spells
During July 2013, Hall and fellow Tottenham teammate Massimo Luongo joined League One side Swindon Town on a season-long loan deal.

Hall signed for Football League Championship club Birmingham City on loan for the 2014–15 season. He made his debut in the starting eleven for the opening-day defeat at Middlesbrough, and formed a partnership with David Edgar at the start of the season. However, the return of captain Paul Robinson to the starting eleven and the arrival of Michael Morrison pushed Hall down the pecking order, he played his last game for the club on 25 October, and his loan was terminated at the beginning of the January 2015 transfer window.

He spent the second half of the season at Blackpool, also of the Championship.

Queens Park Rangers
On 7 August 2015, Hall signed for Championship club Queens Park Rangers on a two-year deal after a successful trial at the club. He made his competitive QPR debut five days later in a 3–0 win against Yeovil Town in the first round of the 2015–16 Football League Cup. Hall was a regular in QPR's defence throughout the season, and his performances were rewarded with the Supporters' Player of the Year award for 2015–16.

Hall left QPR on 19 June 2020 after failing to agree a new contract.

Middlesbrough

On 31 July 2020, Hall signed for Middlesbrough on a free transfer. He scored his first goal for Middlesbrough in a 2-1 win at Coventry City on 2 March 2021.

International career
He indicated that he would be likely to accept a call-up for Ireland national football team if asked.

Career statistics

Honours
Individual
Queens Park Rangers Supporters' Player of the Year: 2015–16

References

External links

Grant Hall player profile on the Brighton & Hove Albion website
Grant Hall Profile at Aylesbury United F.C.

1991 births
Living people
Footballers from Brighton
English footballers
Association football defenders
Lewes F.C. players
Brighton & Hove Albion F.C. players
Whitehawk F.C. players
Bognor Regis Town F.C. players
Tottenham Hotspur F.C. players
Swindon Town F.C. players
Birmingham City F.C. players
Blackpool F.C. players
Queens Park Rangers F.C. players
Middlesbrough F.C. players
Rotherham United F.C. players
National League (English football) players
English Football League players
English people of Irish descent